Dương (楊) is a Vietnamese surname or given name. The name is transliterated as Yang in Mandarin Chinese and in Korean and Yeung in Cantonese. It is commonly anglicized as Duong. It is not to be confused with another Vietnamese surname Đường (唐 ), which is anglicized the same; some write Dzuong to distinguish the two.

Notable people
Dương Đình Nghệ, administrator of Giao Chỉ in around 931 AD
Dương Vân Nga, only empress dowager of the Đinh dynasty and afterwards empress of Lê Đại Hành, the first emperor of the Early Lê dynasty
Dương Tam Kha, King of Vietnam during the short time from 944 to 950 in the Ngô Dynasty
Dương Nhật Lễ, emperor of Đại Việt from 1369 to 1370
Dương Văn An, minister in the cabinet of Mạc dynasty
Dương Hiếu Nghĩa, ARVN officer
Dương Hồng Sơn, footballer 
Dương Quỳnh Hoa, member of the National Liberation Front of South Vietnam during the Vietnam War and a member of its provisional government, serving as a cabinet member.
Dương Thu Hương, Vietnamese author and political dissident.
Dương Trương Thiên Lý, beauty pageant contestant 
Dương Thụ, composer
Dương Triệu Vũ (Tuấn Linh), singer 
Dương Văn Đức, ARVN general
Dương Văn Minh, President of South Vietnam, Army of the Republic of Vietnam general
Dương Văn Nhựt, general in the People's Army of Vietnam, brother of Dương Văn Minh
Dương Văn Khánh, President of the Đồng Xuân Labor Union and mob boss
Porter Duong, American actress

See also
Yang (surname)

Vietnamese-language surnames

vi:Dương